Kaan may refer to:

People, persons, titles, characters
 Kaan (name), a Turkish name
 K.A.A.N., abbreviation for Knowledge Above All Nonsense, an American rapper
 Kagan, a title for a ruler in Turkic and Mongolian languages
 Lord Kaan, a fictional character in the Star Wars Expanded Universe

Places
 Kaan (Maya state), a pre-Columbian state of the Maya civilization
 Ka'an Arcus, Ultima, 486958 Arrokoth (Ultima Thule), Kuiper Belt, Solar System; a circular region

Other uses
 KAAN-FM, an American radio station
 KAAN (AM), an American radio station
 Kaan (film), a 2016 Indian film
 Kaan: Barbarian's Blade, a video game

See also 

 KAAN-717, a gun
 Siaan Kaan or Uaxactun, an ancient ruin of the Maya civilization
 
 Caan (disambiguation)
 Kahn (German surname)
 Kan (disambiguation)
 Khan (disambiguation)